Trichospermum is a genus of flowering plants in the family Malvaceae sensu lato or Tiliaceae or Sparrmanniaceae. Species are distributed in Malesia to the tropical Americas.

Species
Plants of the World Online lists:

Trichospermum arachnoideum Kosterm.
Trichospermum burretii Kosterm.
Trichospermum buruensis Kosterm.
Trichospermum calyculatum (Seem.) Burret
Trichospermum discolor Elmer
Trichospermum eriopodum (Turcz.) Merr.
Trichospermum fauroensis Kosterm.
Trichospermum fletcheri Kosterm.
Trichospermum fosbergii Kosterm.
Trichospermum galeottii (Turcz.) Kosterm.
Trichospermum gracile Kosterm.
Trichospermum graciliflorum Kosterm.
Trichospermum grewioides Kosterm.
Trichospermum heliotrichum Kosterm.
Trichospermum ikutae Kaneh.
Trichospermum incaniopsis Kosterm.
Trichospermum incanum Merr. & L.M.Perry
Trichospermum inmac (Guillaumin) Burret
Trichospermum involucratum (Merr.) Elmer
Trichospermum javanicum Blume
Trichospermum kajewskii Merr. & L.M.Perry
Trichospermum kjellbergii Burret
Trichospermum lanigerum Merr.
Trichospermum ledermannii Burret
Trichospermum lessertianum (Hochr.) Dorr
Trichospermum mexicanum (DC.) Baill.
Trichospermum morotaiense Kosterm.
Trichospermum negrosense (Elmer) Elmer
Trichospermum ovatum Kosterm.
Trichospermum peekelii Burret
Trichospermum pleiostigma (F.Muell.) Kosterm.
Trichospermum pseudojavanicum Burret
Trichospermum psilocladum Merr. & L.M.Perry
Trichospermum quadrivalve Merr.
Trichospermum rhamnifolium Kosterm.
Trichospermum richii (A.Gray) Seem.
Trichospermum sacciferum Burret
Trichospermum samoense Burret
Trichospermum smithii Kosterm.
Trichospermum stevensii W.N.Takeuchi
Trichospermum subdehiscens Kosterm.
Trichospermum talaudensis Kosterm.
Trichospermum tripyxis (K.Schum.) Kosterm.

References

 
Malvaceae genera